Michelsonne Paris was a French brand of toy piano manufactured from 1939 to 1970, and created by Victor Michel (1904–1983).

They were named "bell-tone pianos" on their publicity brochure. They became very rare to find. In 1970, a fire destroyed their factory at 7 rue Duvergier in Paris 75019, and the patents were sold to Bontempi. Bontempi has continued building the same models for a 4-year-old audience. However, there are a few visual differences. They used black keys and a dark brown body layout.  

There are several models:
 chromatic upright pianos with 13, 16, 20, 25, 30, 37 or 49 keys
 chromatic grand pianos with 25, 30, 37 or 49 keys

In France many toy-piano players use Michelsonne pianos because of their beautiful and inimitable sound.  Players include Pascal Comelade, Yann Tiersen, Timothée Jolly, Pascal Ayerbe, Les blérots de Ravel, and Chapi chapo et les petites musiques de pluie.

External links
 Play with your mouse or keyboard a Michelsonne toy-piano from Pascal Ayerbe's collection (requires Adobe Flash)
 See Michelsonne Toy pianos and others vintage musical toys
  A collection of different brands and toypianos from Germany

Piano manufacturing companies
Companies based in Paris
Musical instrument manufacturing companies of France
French companies established in 1939
Manufacturing companies established in 1939
Toy companies established in 1939